Uwe Schröder (born 27 July 1962) is a German sports shooter. He competed in the men's 50 metre running target event at the 1984 Summer Olympics.

References

External links
 

1962 births
Living people
German male sport shooters
Olympic shooters of West Germany
Shooters at the 1984 Summer Olympics
People from Uelzen (district)
Sportspeople from Lower Saxony
20th-century German people